Nasirabad (also Romanized as Naşīrābād) is a village in Aliabad Rural District, Khafr District, Jahrom County, Fars Province, Iran. At the 2006 census, its population was 81, in 20 families.

References 

Populated places in Jahrom County